Jasmine Zhang (born March 13, 1978) is a Chinese talk show host, producer and businesswoman. Jasmine was the host and producer (since 2006) of Beijing’s weekly TV program “Fortune Celebrity” on the economic channel (BTV-5). It is the only interview show on the entire economic channel, and primarily focuses on interviewing successful businessmen from all over the world, as well as government officers related to economics. She was also the host and deputy director of “Beijing Influence”, the economic circle's top awards ceremony in Beijing, China. In addition, she has also hosted many other interview shows; news conferences; forums; and ceremonies. In 2006, she was awarded the title of “Outstanding TV Host”, and coined as Headed Figure of BTV-5, due to the success of the 3rd “Beijing Influence Awards”. In 2009, Zhang suspended her work and took degree abroad. She received a master's degree in the program of Communication Management at Annenberg School of Communication and Journalism at University of Southern California in 2011.

Early life

Zhang was born in LanZhou, China, to Zhang ZiQiang, an engineer in a state running company and his wife Qing LanYing, a doctor in local epidemic/disease control center.

In 1997, when she was 19, she started her first company by recruiting performers from art school, musical school, and model training institutions. After one year in business, she decided to discontinue her business in order to become a performer. She went to Beijing Film Academy for a one-year precollege study. At that time, she planned to become an actress. Followed by the precollege study, she joined in Dept of TV and Film Arts at NanJing Art Institute and majored in Performance.

Career

TV Shows

Forums & Ceremonies

References

1978 births
Businesspeople from Gansu
Living people
People from Lanzhou